Major-General (William) Desmond Mangham CB (29 August 1924 – 23 November 2014) was a British Army officer who commanded 2nd Division.

Military career
Educated at Ampleforth College, Mangham was commissioned into the Royal Artillery in 1943 during World War II. He became Commanding Officer of 3rd Regiment Royal Horse Artillery in 1966. He was appointed Commander Royal Artillery for 2nd Division in 1968, Chief of Staff for 1st (British) Corps in 1972 and General Officer Commanding 2nd Division in 1974. His last appointment was as Vice Quartermaster-General in 1976 before retiring in 1979.

In retirement he became Director of the Brewer's Association. He died on 23 November 2014.

Family
In 1960 he married Susan Humfrey; they have two sons and two daughters.

References

1924 births
2014 deaths
British Army generals
Companions of the Order of the Bath
Royal Artillery officers
People educated at Ampleforth College
British Army personnel of World War II